Ground Control II: Operation Exodus is a 2004 real-time tactics video game developed by Massive Entertainment. It is a sequel to Ground Control, the award-winning game of the same genre. Much like its predecessor, it features 3D graphics and a fully rotational camera system.

Gameplay 
Similar to the first Ground Control, Operation Exodus focuses on combat tactics rather than base construction or managing an economy. However, unlike its purely real-time tactics predecessor, Ground Control II has a resource system called acquisition. Acquisition points are earned through the capturing of victory locations and destruction of enemy forces and allow the player to field units on the battlefield and use the support weapons that are unique to each faction. The game is also significantly faster paced than its predecessor and moves along at a pace similar to real-time strategy games such as Command & Conquer.

The game features a three-sided conflict. However, only two of the factions, the Northern Star Alliance and the Viron Nomads, are actually playable. The Terran Empire is a non-playable faction featured only in the single-player campaign. The two playable sides feature a total of 33 units available. All of these units are deployed onto the battlefield through dropships, much like the deployment procedures of its predecessor. These units include infantry, tanks, infantry fighting vehicles, aircraft, artillery, and static emplacements. Unlike Ground Control, however, unit customization is unavailable; each individual unit features a fixed secondary function.

Plot
The story of Ground Control II takes place in that same universe as that of the original game but starts 320 years later and has little in common with the original game. The human race has discovered faster than light travel and has colonized the galaxy. There are two groups of colonies in this universe, dubbed the Inner Sphere and Outer Sphere. A physical phenomenon causes the communications between the two area to be only possible through a network of special relay stations built at the border of the spheres. Intergalactic travel is also impossible due to an unexplained barrier between the galaxies.

After the battle of Krig-7b that took place in the original video game, Major Sarah Parker (the original game's protagonist) destroyed the Earth's early warning relay station, commandeered a battlecruiser called CSS Astrid (seen in the original game) and escaped. In the next centuries, a stellar war that lasted 70 years changed the political layout of the colonies. A colony called Draconis Empire subjugated the Inner Sphere and established the Empire of Terra. It destroyed the communication relays, severing communications with the Outer Sphere. The next two hundred years was the age of strife for the Outer Sphere, for they had to rediscover the precious knowledge to which they no longer had access. Eventually, the Outer Sphere colonies formed two interstellar states: The Northern Star Alliance (NSA) and the Intergalactic Trade Guild (ITG). After the two hundred years however, the Empire of Terra invaded the Outer Sphere and began taking over the NSA. In 40 years of battle that followed, the Empire took most of the NSA territory and finally invaded the Morningstar Prime, the capital of NSA.

The game begins with Captain Jacob Angelus becoming a field commander for the NSA. Despite Captain Angelus's "exceptional" battlefield performance, it is clear that NSA cannot win this war and it is only a matter of time before the Empire overwhelm them. An unknown spacecraft crashes on Morningstar Prime which Captain Angelus secures. NSA scientists who study the craft reveal that Major Parker outfitted CSS Astrid with an ancient device called a Singularity Drive that enables the ship to bypass the intergalactic barrier and travel to other galaxies. NSA plans to use the ship to evacuate NSA citizens to another galaxy, where the Empire cannot follow. Angelus is sent to find CSS Astrid but his search is complicated by Imperial forces in pursuit. Eventually, CSS Astrid is recovered and brought back to Morningstar Prime.

On Morningstar Prime, Captain Angelus must deal with the treachery of an NSA general as well as the arrival of fresh Imperial reinforcements. A tragic final battle takes place in which Captain Angelus and his allies help evacuating anyone they can to CSS Astrid and see to their safe departure. Despite all the efforts, the Imperials destroy an entire detachment of NSA forces as well as an NSA shuttle, presumably loaded with passengers. Captain Angelus himself does not make it to CSS Astrid and is stranded on Morningstar Prime.

Development
The game was announced on February 25, 2003. It was originally going to be published through Vivendi Universal's NDA Productions division.

Reception 

Ground Control II: Operation Exodus received "generally favorable reviews" according to video game review aggregator Metacritic. GameSpot named it the best computer game of June 2004.

See also
 Ground Control: Dark Conspiracy

Notes

References

External links
 
 

2004 video games
Cooperative video games
Massive Entertainment games
Real-time tactics video games
Science fiction video games
Video games developed in Sweden
Video games set in the 28th century
Video game sequels
Windows games
Windows-only games